Euura nigricantis is a species of sawfly belonging to the family Tenthredinidae (common sawflies). The larvae feed within galls on the leaves of  dark-leaved willow (Salix myrsinifolia). It was first described by Jens-Peter Kopelke in 1986.

Description of the gall
The dark-red sausage shaped gall (10 mm x 2 mm), is usually in pairs, either side of the midrib and on the upper side of the leaf. On the lower side of the leaf, it is flush with the surface. Inside the gall is a single caterpillar, along with frass. The galls are formed on the leaves of dark-leaved willow (S. myrsinifolia).

Euura nigricantis is one of seven closely related species in the Euura dolichura species group.

Distribution
This species has been recorded from Austria, Finland, Great Britain (Scotland), and Sweden.

References

External links

Tenthredinidae
Gall-inducing insects
Hymenoptera of Europe
Insects described in 1986
Taxa named by Jens-Peter Kopelke
Willow galls